The Female of the Species may refer to:

The Female of the Species (Kipling poem), first published in 1911
"For the female of the species is deadlier than the male" is the chorus of the Walker Brothers' title track for the 1967 British film Deadlier Than the Male
The Female of the Species (play), a comic play written by Joanna Murray-Smith and produced in the West End, London, in 2008
Female of the Species, a 1996 song by Space
The Female of the Species: Tales of Mystery and Suspense, an anthology edited by Joyce Carol Oates
The Female of the Species, a 1928 novel by H. C. McNeile
 The Female of the Species, a 1987 novel by Lionel Shriver
Female of the Species & Female of the Species Vol2, A 2 cd compilation series from Law & Auder Records featuring female electronic musicians from around the world
 "The Female of the Species is More Deadly Than the Male" is also the title of volume 38 of the comic series The Boys
 The Female of the Species (film), a 1912 short film directed by D. W. Griffith